Journal of Spatial Information Science is a peer-reviewed open access academic journal covering geographical information science. It is published by the University of Maine and the editors-in-chief are Ross Purves, Benjamin Adams, and Somayeh Dodge. Mike Worboys, Matt Duckham, and Jörg-Rüdiger Sack were the founding editors of the journal when it was established in 2010.

Abstracting and indexing
The journal is abstracted and indexed in Scopus and the  Emerging Sources Citation Index.

References

External links

Publications established in 2010
English-language journals
Biannual journals
Geography journals
University of Maine publications
Academic journals published by universities and colleges of the United States
Geographic information science